Altan is the second (studio) album by Frankie Kennedy and Mairéad Ní Mhaonaigh (future founders of the Irish band Altan), originally released in 1987 by Green Linnet Records. The musicians appearing on this album are substantially those that became the early incarnation of the band Altan. The band later (retroactively) called Altan their debut album.

Track listing
 "The Highlandman/The Cliffs of Glencolumbkille/Old Cuffe Street" – 3:12
 "An tSeanchailleach Gallda/Dermot Byrne's" – 3:04
 "Tá Mo Cleamhnas a Dhéanamh" – 5:15
 "The Cat That Ate The Candle/Over the Water to Bessie" – 3:10
 "Ceol A'Phíobaire" – 3:50
 "Tommy Peoples'/Loch Altan/Danny Meehan's" – 3:28
 "Rogha an Ghabha/Charlie O'Donnell's" – 2:40
 "The Sunset" – 3:38
 "Thug Mé Rúide" – 4:25
 "Humours of Whiskey/The Fairy Jig/Humours of Whiskey" – 3:18
 "Jimmy Lyons'/Leslie's Reel" – 2:21
 "Cití na gCumann" – 3:57
 "Con Cassidy's Highland/Neilly O'Boyle's Highland & Reel" – 3:05

Credits
Tracks 1,2,5,6,7,9,11,12,13 arranged by Kennedy, Ní Mhaonaigh, Kelly, Curran.
Tracks 3,4,8,10 arranged by Kennedy, Ní Mhaonaigh, Kelly, Curran, Lunny.

All tracks are traditionals, except the following:
"The Sunset" – composed by Cathal McConnell and Seamus Quinn.
"Loch Altan" – composed by Mairéad Ní Mhaonaigh.

Personnel
Mairéad Ní Mhaonaigh – Fiddle, Vocals
Frankie Kennedy –  Flute
Ciarán Curran – Bouzouki
Mark Kelly – Guitar
Dónal Lunny – Bodhrán, Keyboards
Anna Ní Mhaonaigh – Vocals on "Ceol a'Phíobaire"

Production
Dónal Lunny – Producer, Engineer
Lolly Kupec – Design

References

Altan (band) albums
Frankie Kennedy albums
Mairéad Ní Mhaonaigh albums
1987 albums